A pulse generator is either an electronic circuit or a piece of electronic test equipment used to generate rectangular pulses. Pulse generators are used primarily for working with digital circuits; related function generators are used primarily for analog circuits.

Bench pulse generators

Simple bench pulse generators usually allow control of the pulse repetition rate (frequency), pulse width, delay with respect to an internal or external trigger and the high- and low-voltage levels of the pulses. More sophisticated pulse generators may allow control over the rise time and fall time of the pulses. Pulse generators are available for generating output pulses having widths (duration) ranging from minutes to under 1 picosecond.

Pulse generators are generally  voltage sources, with true current pulse generators being available only from a few suppliers.

Pulse generators may use  digital techniques,  analog techniques, or a combination of both techniques to form the output pulses. For example, the pulse repetition rate and duration may be digitally controlled but the pulse amplitude and rise and fall times may be determined by analog circuitry in the output stage of the pulse generator. With correct adjustment, pulse generators can also produce a 50% duty cycle square wave. Pulse generators are generally single-channel, providing one frequency, delay, width and output.

Optical pulse generators
Light pulse generators are the optical equivalent to electrical pulse generators with rep rate, delay, width and  amplitude control. The output in this case is light, typically from a LED or laser diode.

Multiple-channels
A new family of pulse generators can produce multiple channels of independent widths and delays and independent outputs and polarities. Often called digital delay/pulse generators, the newest designs even offer differing repetition rates with each channel. These digital delay generators are useful in synchronizing, delaying, gating and triggering multiple devices, usually with respect to one event. One is also able to multiplex the timing of several channels onto one channel in order to trigger or even gate the same device multiple times.

A new class of pulse generator offers both multiple input trigger connections and multiple output connections. Multiple input triggers allow experimenters to synchronize both trigger events and data acquisition events using the same timing controller.

In general, generators for pulses with widths over a few microseconds employ digital counters for timing these pulses, while widths between approximately 1 nanosecond and several microseconds are typically generated by analog techniques such as RC (resistor-capacitor) networks or switched delay lines.

Microwave pulsers
Pulse generators capable of generating pulses with widths under approximately 100 picoseconds are often termed as "microwave pulsers" and typically generate these ultra-short pulses using Step recovery diode (SRD) or Nonlinear Transmission Line (NLTL) methods (for example ). Step Recovery Diode pulse generators are inexpensive, but typically require several volts of input drive level and have a moderately high level of random jitter (usually undesirable variation in the time at which successive pulses occur).

NLTL-based pulse generators generally have lower jitter, but are more complex to manufacture and do not suit integration in low-cost monolithic ICs. A new class of microwave pulse generation architecture, the RACE (Rapid Automatic Cascode Exchange) pulse generation circuit is implemented using low-cost monolithic IC technology and can produce pulses as short as 1 picosecond and repetition rates exceeding 30 billion pulses per second. These pulsers are typically used in military communications applications and low-power microwave transceiver ICs. Such pulsers, if driven by a continuous frequency clock, will act as microwave comb generators, having output frequency components at integer multiples of the pulse repetition rate, and extending to well over 100 gigahertz (for example ).

Applications
Pulses can be injected into a device that is under test and used as a stimulus, clock signal, or analyzed as they progress through the device, confirming the proper operation of the device or
pinpointing a fault in the device. Pulse generators are also used to drive devices such as switches, lasers and optical components, modulators, intensifiers, and resistive loads. The output of a pulse generator may also be used as the modulation signal for a signal generator. Non-electronic applications include those in material science, medical, physics, and chemistry.

Examples
 Ballistics testing uses high voltage pulse generator 
 "Signal cable selection for Veritas Observatory" with <200 ps risetime pulse generator 
 Single channel pulse generators were in existence in the 1950s 
 "Characterization of Permalloy films on high-bandwidth striplines" Journal of Magnetism and Magnetic Materials Volumes 272-276, Supplement 1, May 2004, Pages E1341-E1342
 "Protoporphyrin IX Occurs Naturally in Colorectal Cancers and Their Metastases" 
 Testing Silicon Strip Detector with IR Light Pulse Generator 

 Toward Intrinsic Ferroelectric Switching in Multiferroic BiFeO3

References

Electronic circuits
Electronic test equipment